Basketball at the 2024 Summer Olympics in Paris, France will be held from 27 July to 11 August 2024. Preliminary 5-on-5 basketball matches will occur at Pierre Mauroy Stadium in Lille, with the final phase staged at the Bercy Arena in Paris. Retaining its position in the program, the 3×3 competitions will be played at Place de la Concorde.

Medal summary

Medal table

Events

Qualification summary

5×5 basketball

Qualification
The National Olympic Committees may enter only one 12-player men's team and only one 12-player women's team.

Men's qualification

Women's qualification

3×3 basketball

Qualification
For the second time in history, the 3×3 basketball tournament features eight teams competing in the men's and women's events. The National Olympic Committees may enter only one 4-player men's team and only one 4-player women's team. Each team constitutes three players on the court and a single substitute.

Men's qualification

Women's qualification

See also
Basketball at the 2022 Asian Games
Basketball at the 2023 Pan American Games

References

 
2024
2024 Summer Olympics events
Olympics
International basketball competitions hosted by France